Lough Anure is a freshwater lake in the northwest of County Donegal, Ireland.

Geography and hydrology
It is the largest lake in the Rosses region of the county. The lake drains to the north via the River Crolly (also known as the Gweedore River).

Natural history
Fish species in Lough Anure include brown trout, common minnow, salmon and the critically endangered European eel. Brown trout are the most abundant. Salmon are not always present in the lake and the 2020 fish stock survey recorded only a single specimen.

See also
List of loughs in Ireland

References

Anure